Evelyn Lawler (born October 18, 1929) is a retired American track and field athlete.  She competed for the United States in the 80 metres hurdles at the 1951 Pan American Games, finishing 6th, and formerly held the American record in the 80 metres hurdles.

Lawler graduated from Tuskegee University. She started in the sport as a sophomore in high school when her school picked 6 or 7 girls for a start-up track team.  Lawler was not selected but watched them practice. She later asked if she could join the team, and beat all the other girls. When her school competed at a meet at Tuskegee, the coach Major Cleveland L. Abbott invited her to come to the University.

She started hurdling when the previous hurdlers including 1948 Olympian Theresa Manuel had graduated and the coach suggested she take up the discipline. Her trip to the Pan Am games in Buenos Aires, Argentina was her first out of the country, the first time on a plane and first national team. By 1952, she had become one of the best three hurdlers in the world, but injuries prevented her from qualifying for the Olympics. She continued to participate in Masters athletics but eventually retired from the sport due to injuries.

Lawler is the mother of multiple Olympic gold medalist Carl Lewis, World Championship bronze medalist and sports announcer Carol Lewis, and professional soccer player Cleveland Lewis.

References

External links 
 Profile at trackfield.brinkster.net

Living people
American female hurdlers
Pan American Games track and field athletes for the United States
Athletes (track and field) at the 1951 Pan American Games
1929 births
21st-century American women
20th-century American women